Jorge Pinto Mendonça (June 6, 1954 – February 17, 2006) was a Brazilian footballer during the 1970s and 1980s, playing in a striker role.

Career
Born in Silva Jardim, he scored 417 goals during his career (1972–1991). With Brazilian team he played 6 official games without scoring any goals (he was Zico reserve in 1978 FIFA World Cup). He won the São Paulo State Championship in 1976 and was the top goalscorer in the same tournament in 1981 - 38 goals by Guarani. After he retired he suffered of financial, healthy and familiar problems. However, in his last years, he directed a childcare project of Guarani. He died at Hospital Mário Gatti, in Campinas, at 51 years old from a heart attack in Campinas. Jorge Mendonça is buried in Cemitério das Acácias in Valinhos, city next to Campinas,São Paulo.

Awards
 Campeonato Pernambucano: 1974 (Náutico)
 Campeonato Paulista: 1976 (Palmeiras)
 Taça de Prata (Brazilian Second Division): 1981 (Guarani)

1954 births
2006 deaths
Brazilian footballers
Association football forwards
Cruzeiro Esporte Clube players
Guarani FC players
Sociedade Esportiva Palmeiras players
Associação Atlética Ponte Preta players
CR Vasco da Gama players
Paulista Futebol Clube players
Rio Branco Esporte Clube players
Paraná Clube players
Bangu Atlético Clube players
Clube Náutico Capibaribe players
1978 FIFA World Cup players
Brazil international footballers